A crouton  is a piece of rebaked bread, often cubed and seasoned. Croutons are used to add texture and flavor to salads—notably the Caesar salad— or eaten as a snack food.

Etymology

The word crouton is derived from the French croûton, itself a diminutive of croûte, meaning "crust". Croutons are often seen in the shape of small cubes, but they can be of any size and shape, up to a very large slice. Many people now use crouton for croute, so the usage has changed. Historically, however, a croute was a slice of a baguette lightly brushed with oil or clarified butter and baked. In English descriptions of French cooking, croûte is not only a noun but also has a verb form that describes the cooking process that transforms the bread into the crust.

Preparation
The preparation of croutons is relatively simple. Typically the cubes of bread are lightly coated in oil or butter (which may be seasoned or flavored for variety) and then baked. Croutons can also be cut into sticks.  Some commercial preparations use machinery to sprinkle various seasonings on them. Alternatively, they may be fried lightly in butter or vegetable oil, until crisp and brown, to give them a buttery flavor and crunchy texture. Some croutons are prepared with the addition of cheese.

Nearly any type of bread—in a loaf or pre-sliced, with or without crust—may be used to make croutons. Dry or stale bread or leftover bread is usually used instead of fresh bread. Once prepared, the croutons will remain fresh far longer than unprepared bread.

List of possible ingredients 
 bread
 garlic
 butter or oil (e.g., olive oil or rapeseed oil)
 Parmesan
 herbs
 spices (ground or whole)

Gastronomy
A dish prepared à la Grenobloise (in the Grenoble manner) has a garnish of small croutons along with beurre noisette, capers, parsley, and lemon.

Dried and cubed bread is commonly sold in large bags in North America to make Thanksgiving holiday stuffing or dressing. However, these are generally different from salad croutons, being only dry bread instead of buttered or oiled and with other seasonings.

See also

 Biscotti
 Breadcrumb
 Bruschetta
 Crostino
 Garlic bread
 List of bread dishes
 Rusk
 Shkedei marak
 Zwieback

References

External links

Bread dishes
Salads
Condiments

eo:Rostpano